The Stanford–UConn women’s basketball rivalry is an intercollegiate basketball rivalry between the Stanford Cardinal and UConn Huskies. The rivalry series is between two of the most successful in women's basketball, as the programs have combined for 13 NCAA titles. Stanford and UConn have met seven times in the NCAA tournament, with six of these postseason meetings occurring in the Final Four. As of 2022, UConn leads the series 12–7.

Series history 
After Stanford won the first three meetings, UConn grabbed their first victory in the 1995 tournament, blowing out the Cardinal by a score of 87–60 in the national semifinals. UConn would win its following game over Tennessee for their first national championship. 

The teams would meet thrice more in the postseason before the 2010 tournament with the national title at stake. In San Antonio, UConn downed Stanford 53 to 47 to overcome an 8 point halftime deficit and cap off an undefeated season. The following season, the Cardinal snapped the Huskies' 90-game winning streak, a week after Connecticut had broken the previous record of 88 games by UCLA. The loss was the first by UConn since 2008, when Stanford had beaten the Huskies in the 2008 Final Four. The Huskies returned the favor in 2012, ending the Cardinal's 82-game winning steak at Maples Pavilion in a 1-2 ranked matchup. 

In 2014, the Cardinal again played spoilers. Stanford defeated the Huskies in overtime to snap UConn's 47-game winning streak. Amber Orrange hit a game-tying 3-pointer in the closing seconds of the second half, sending the game to extra time, and then scored the go-ahead basket in the final two minutes of overtime. The Huskies followed that defeat by reeling off 111 wins in a row, including another victory over the Cardinal in the national semifinals of the 2014 NCAA tournament.

Rival accomplishments 
The following summarizes the accomplishments of the two programs.

Game results

References 

College basketball rivalries in the United States
 
UConn Huskies women's basketball